Gangnan is a town of Pingshan County in the eastern foothills of the Taihang Mountains in southwestern Hebei province, China, located  northeast of the county seat near the Gangnan Reservoir (:zh:岗南水库) of the Hutuo River (:zh:滹沱河). , it has 44 villages under its administration.

See also
List of township-level divisions of Hebei

References

Township-level divisions of Hebei
Pingshan County, Hebei